The nasion  is the most anterior point of the frontonasal suture that joins the nasal part of the frontal bone and the nasal bones. It marks the midpoint at the intersection of the frontonasal suture with the internasal suture joining the nasal bones. It is  visible on the face as a distinctly depressed area directly between the eyes, just superior to the bridge of the nose. It is a cephalometric landmark that is just below the glabella.

References

Facial features